Dark Horse is the debut studio album by American country music singer Devin Dawson. It was released on January 19, 2018, via Warner Bros. Records Nashville.

Content
Dawson co-wrote every song on the album, including lead single "All on Me". Jay Joyce served as the album's producer.

Critical reception
Stephen Thomas Erlewine of AllMusic wrote that "there's a fleetness in Dawson's delivery, an exactitude in his songcraft, and a mellowness in his execution that push his music toward the confines of country". Sounds Like Nashville writer Annie Reuter reviewed the album positively, stating that "His unique storytelling partnered with Joyce's standout production give Dark Horse a timeless appeal, which is surely just a taste of Dawson’s promising career."

Commercial performance
The album debuted on Billboards Top Country Albums at No. 5, selling 7,000 copies (11,000 in album equivalent units) in the first week. It has sold 18,000 copies in the United States as of June 2018.

Track listing
"Dip" (Devin Dawson, Barry Dean, Luke Laird) – 3:22
"All on Me" (Dawson, Jacob Durrett, Austin Smith) – 3:44
"Asking for a Friend" (Dawson, Connie Harrington, Brett Beavers) – 3:59
"Second to Last" (Dawson, Laura Veltz, Mark Trussell) – 3:19
"Symptoms" (Dawson, Austin Smith) – 4:03
"I Don't Care Who Sees" (Dawson, Smith, Jake Mitchell, Jacob Durrett) – 3:21
"Secondhand Hurt" (Dawson, Will Bowen) – 4:01
"Placebo" (Dawson, Jordan Reynolds, David Hodges) – 3:04
"War Paint" (Dawson, Clint Lagerberg, Chris DuBois) – 3:42
"I Can’t Trust Myself" (Dawson, Jillian Jacqueline, Brad Warren, Brett Warren) – 3:10
"Prison" (Dawson, Seth Ennis, Josh Kerr) – 3:41
"Dark Horse" (Dawson, Andy Albert, Andrew DeRoberts) – 3:31

Personnel
Adapted from AllMusic

Kip Allen – drums, handclapping, percussion, programming
Devin Dawson – acoustic guitar, handclapping, lead vocals, background vocals
Nick DiMaria – banjo, acoustic guitar, electric guitar, background vocals
Fred Eltringham – programming
Jason Hall – handclapping
Jaxon Hargrove – handclapping
Jillian Jacqueline – background vocals
Jay Joyce – bass guitar, bells, bowed vibes, acoustic guitar, electric guitar, handclapping, keyboards, lap steel guitar, percussion, programming
Jimmy Mansfield – handclapping
Sam Rodberg – bass guitar, handclapping
Austin Smith – electric guitar, handclapping, background vocals

Charts

Weekly charts

Year-end charts

References

2018 debut albums
Devin Dawson albums
Warner Records albums
Albums produced by Jay Joyce